King & Maxwell is an American drama television series that ran on TNT from June 10 to August 12, 2013. The series featured Jon Tenney and Rebecca Romijn as Washington, D.C.–based former Secret Service agents solving crimes as private detectives. NCIS: Los Angeles creator Shane Brennan created the show based on David Baldacci's novels. On September 20, 2013, TNT canceled the series after one season.

Cast

Main

 Jon Tenney as Sean King: Sean King is a former Secret Service agent who was unceremoniously fired from the Secret Service when presidential candidate Ritter (Jeff Hephner) was shot while King was on point guarding Ritter. King now runs a private detective agency with his partner Michelle Maxwell, and their (technical) assistant, Edgar. The show's opening features a short flashback of Ritter's shooting. While King does not come across as a clean freak, he frequently shows disgust with his partner Michelle's less than outstanding neatness. Usually used in some comedic fashion, King rarely has his gun, and when he does, the gun is often unloaded. King struggles with compelling his clients to pay for the group's services. Usually, he either sympathizes with his clients or he feels responsible when the client is upset with the results of King's efforts. The lack of reliable payments from clients often leads Edgar to remind King that the business needs money. Their office is away from the city, located in a lakeside beach house. King appears to have no family, except for an estranged aunt. King appears close to his partner (Maxwell) and they enjoy light teasing and casual repartee.
 Rebecca Romijn as Michelle Maxwell: Michelle Maxwell is also a former Secret Service agent who was terminated after allowing the man she was supposed to protect get kidnapped. At the start of the series, it is revealed that Maxwell's firing occurred around a year and a half prior to present day and Maxwell is still adjusting. Unlike King, Maxwell does not keep her car, work or living areas very clean or organized. Maxwell likes to keep fit and often rows a boat to the office. She has a father, with whom she shares a strained relationship, and four brothers. Following their father's example as a police captain, she and all her brothers have been or are in law enforcement. Her brother J.T. (Christian Kane) was the best of all of them and trying to look out for his maverick antics. Maxwell enjoys the banter between herself and King and the show portrays King as Maxwell's best friend.
 Ryan Hurst as Edgar Roy: Maxwell and King's assistant. Edgar is an autistic savant whose skills lie in numerical patterns and sequences, as well as high-tech maintenance and installation. He has strong hacking skills. In the pilot, we learned that Edgar was a suspected serial killer and that King lost his dearest friend and mentor as a result of taking on Edgar's case. We also learned that Edgar was not the criminal and it was revealed that Edgar was framed by a company that was the largest rival to Edgar's prior employer. After Edgar is cleared, Maxwell casually offers Edgar a job (without discussing the matter with King and the shows makes it appear that Maxwell wasn't serious about the job offer). King & Maxwell struggle with how to fire Edgar until they realize how useful his skills are. Edgar's autism makes him emotionally vulnerable when he is over-stimulated or stressed. Edgar copes with these reactions by meticulously focusing on sharpening a pencil with a hand-held sharpener. Edgar seems to greatly value his friendships, and he considers both Michelle and Sean friends. He is eager to help and is often looking for ways to please them. Edgar has one sister. He also seems to be slowly developing a closeness with Benny, a helpful former criminal, and often a source of information for Sean and the agency.
 Michael O'Keefe as FBI Agent Frank Rigby: First introduced in the beginning of the series, Agent Rigby is an FBI agent who was associated with Edgar's case. Agent Rigby does not like Sean or Michelle or their "interference" with the agent's cases. He is a very terse individual who gives little slack to anyone. Agent Rigby is portrayed as being very difficult to please, leading to him having multiple partners. His current partner, Agent Darius Carter, seems to be Rigby's favorite partner. Agent Rigby is divorced. Rigby is behind, career-wise, in part because of his handling of a West Virginia kidnapping case where he shot the kidnapper of a 17-year-old girl when the kidnapper was the only person to know where the kidnapped child was buried.
 Chris Butler as FBI Agent Darius Carter:  Agent Rigby's partner. Agent Carter seems to be the beta between himself and his partner, and is the first to be drawn into King and Maxwell's pace having a much more positive reaction to King and Maxwell than Agent Rigby. He more often than not plays a background role in cases, though he seems to be a good agent in his own right.  At one point, he was removed from the force after he assaulted a law enforcement officer.  It was later learned that the officer Carter struck was deliberately provoking him in order to get him suspended so that his confidential informant wouldn't reveal information he had about a murder. The informant was also murdered to cover this up.  Agent Carter's brother was shot by a law enforcement official after being pulled over in his car rendering him a paraplegic.  Agent Carter's memories of the event reveal his belief that his brother was unnecessarily fired on due to the law enforcement officer's racist beliefs and actions. Carter shows appreciation for their work, ethic, and assistance when they helped him with his own incident.

Recurring
Dichen Lachman as Benny, a counterfeiter Sean helped to convict whom he now uses as a source.
Martin Donovan as Bob Scott, a retired Secret Service agent who worked with Sean.  
Wade Sun as Wu, owner of Lucy's Cafe, which is one of Sean's favorite diners. 
Catherine Bell as Joan Dillinger, a hostage negotiator and former Secret Service agent who worked with Sean.

Episodes

Broadcast
In Australia the series airs on SoHo, premiering April 8, 2014.

Home media

References

External links

 
 King & Maxwell at The Futon Critic
 

2010s American crime drama television series
2013 American television series debuts
2013 American television series endings
English-language television shows
Television series by CBS Studios
Television shows filmed in Vancouver
Television shows set in Washington, D.C.
TNT (American TV network) original programming
American detective television series